Nikifor Maruszeczko (March 15, 1913 – August 8, 1938) was a Polish criminal and serial killer, considered to be one of the most dangerous criminals in the Interwar period.

Life 
Nikifor Maruszeczko was born in Podkarpackie. He never knew his father, and was raised by an alcoholic mother. As a child, he wandered in the neighbouring villages with a backyard band, but quickly entered the crime scene. He was arrested for the first time for stealing a portfolio at the age of 14, for which he was sent to a correctional home.

At the beginning of the 1930s he went to Upper Silesia, where he quickly gained the reputation of a brutal and ruthless criminal. He committed several murders, mainly on a robbery background. He was on the list of most wanted people in the country, but on several occasions he evaded police raids. He hid among others in Berlin, where he continued his criminal activity.

He was known for his tendency to abuse alcohol, repeatedly committing his crimes in a state of intoxication. His alcohol addiction contributed to the spectacular end of his criminal career. On January 8, 1938 Maruszeczko made a row in the restaurant "Pod-Orłem" in Bielsko-Biała. Recognized by clients (the newspapers had his portrait printed on them), he tried to escape, but was captured and handed over to the police.

From October to December 1937, he murdered four people, including two policemen. During the trial he was only tried for killing one policeman and severely hurting another. On February 24, 1938 he was sentenced to death by hanging. The verdict was carried out on August 8, 1938.

Victims

See also
List of serial killers by country

References

Literature 
Based on the book Love, Money and Death by Ryszard Dzieszyński.

1913 births
1937 murders in Poland
1938 deaths
Executed Polish serial killers
Male serial killers
People executed by Poland by hanging
People executed by the Second Polish Republic